The Phantom Buccaneer is a 1916 American silent drama film directed by J. Charles Haydon and starring Richard Travers, Gertrude Glover and Thurlow Brewer. It is based in the 1913 novel Another Man's Shoes by British writer Victor Bridges.

Cast
 Richard Travers as Stuart Northcote / Jack Burton 
 Gertrude Glover as 	Mercia Solano
 Thurlow Brewer as	Billy Logan
 Robert P. Thompson as 	Maurice Furnival 
 James C. Carroll as Lord Sangatte
 Arthur W. Bates as 	Milford
 Ethel Davis as Lady Barradell

References

Bibliography
 Connelly, Robert B. The Silents: Silent Feature Films, 1910-36, Volume 40, Issue 2. December Press, 1998.

External links
 

1916 films
1916 drama films
1910s English-language films
American silent feature films
Silent American drama films
American black-and-white films
Films directed by J. Charles Haydon
Essanay Studios films
Films based on British novels
1910s American films